Roberto Mendes da Silva, known simply as Beto is a retired Brazilian professional footballer, who spent most of his football career in Indian club football.

Career

After spending six seasons with Dempo, Beto switched to Churchill Brothers in 2011. After winning the I-League with Churchill brothers, he switched back to Dempo in the summer of 2013.

He has scored a total of 12 goals for Dempo SC in AFC Cup, the continental club tournament.

Personal life
Beto formed the Brasil Futebol Academia in 2009 with Jose Ramirez Barreto. He has two daughters.

Honours 

Dempo
 I-League: 2006–07, 2007–08, 2009-10
 Durand Cup: 2006
 Goa Professional League: 2007, 2009, 2010

Churchill Brothers
 I-League: 2012–13
 Durand Cup: 2011

Individual
 FPAI Foreign Player of the Year: 2010–11

References

Brazilian footballers
Living people
1979 births
Expatriate footballers in India
Brazilian expatriate sportspeople in India
I-League players
Churchill Brothers FC Goa players
Mohun Bagan AC players
Dempo SC players
Association football midfielders
Footballers from São Paulo